Svend Robert Husted Engedal (June 23, 1928 - November 6, 2001) was a U.S. soccer goalkeeper.  He played on the U.S. soccer team at the 1956 Summer Olympics and earned two caps with the U.S. national team in 1957.

Engedal was born in Denmark, but moved to the United States where he gained his citizenship on September 15, 1955.  He was then selected as the U.S. goalkeeper at the 1956 Summer Olympics.  The U.S. lost 9-1 to Italy in the first round, eliminating the team from the tournament.  At the time, Engedal played club soccer in Los Angeles.  Both of Engedal’s two games with the national team came in losses to Mexico in April 1957.  The first was a 6-0 loss on April 7 and the second a 7-2 loss on April 28.

At the time of the Olympics, Engedal played for the Danish-American Soccer Club.

References

External links
 

1928 births
American soccer players
Danish emigrants to the United States
Association football goalkeepers
United States men's international soccer players
Olympic soccer players of the United States
Footballers at the 1956 Summer Olympics
2001 deaths